Vadookara is a  residential area in southwest Thrissur, Kerala state, India. It is closer to the city starting from Koorkenchery and extending towards Nedupuzha and Aranattukara.

See also
Thrissur

Suburbs of Thrissur city

Facebook Community of Vadookara : https://www.facebook.com/groups/VADOOKARA/